Biological and Pharmaceutical Bulletin is a monthly peer reviewed medical journal published by the Pharmaceutical Society of Japan. The journal was established in 1993 as the successor to The Journal of Pharmacobio-Dynamics (established in 1978). In 2012, the society re-organized its journals, and most material published in the Journal of Health Science now started to be published in Biological and Pharmaceutical Bulletin and with some being published in its sister publication Chemical and Pharmaceutical Bulletin. The editor in chief is Naoto Oku (University of Shizuoka).

Abstracting and indexing
Biological and Pharmaceutical Bulletin is abstracted and indexed in the following databases:
Biosis
Chemical Abstracts Core
Chimica
MEDLINE
Veterinary Science Database
Science Citation Index Expanded
Scopus

References

Pharmacology journals
Publications established in 1993
English-language journals
Monthly journals